Nikolskoye is a rural locality (a selo) in Novochigolskoye Rural Settlement, Talovsky District, Voronezh Oblast, Russia. The population was 744 as of 2010. There are 8 streets.

Geography 
Nikolskoye is located 37 km west of Talovaya (the district's administrative centre) by road. Khrenovoye is the nearest rural locality.

References 

Rural localities in Talovsky District